Prime School is an international private school located in  Estoril and Sintra, close to Lisbon, Portugal.

The first school opened in Sintra in September 2007. An educational project carried out in collaboration with Cambridge International Education (CIE) under the tutelage of the Portuguese Ministry of Education. 

This first class, highly respected, international school has developed an
enriching curriculum, which incorporates the American core curriculum, a career's programme and extensive extra curriculum activities. 

A thriving, truly inclusive multilingual school community with boarding facilities .

Contact the Prime School through its website:
primeschool.pt

External links
 

International schools in Portugal